The 2017–18 NBB season was the 9th season of the Novo Basquete Brasil, the Brazilian basketball league. Once again this tournament was organized entirely by the Liga Nacional de Basquete (LNB). The NBB also qualified teams for international tournaments such as Liga Sudamericana and FIBA Americas League.

This season fifteen teams played each other in the regular season. At the end of the home and away matches round the top four teams qualified for the quarterfinals of the playoffs automatically, while the teams finishing in the 5th and 12th place participated in the first round of the playoffs to determine the other four teams in the quarterfinals, in a five-match series. This season maintained 16/17's playoff method of best of 5 games, played on the 1-2-1-1 format.

For this season, the last regular season placed team is relegated to the 2019 Liga Ouro, the NBB's second tier division. Also, only the 2018 Liga Ouro winner receives the right to play in the NBB 2019–20 season.

Participating teams 

{| class="wikitable sortable"
! Team
! Home city
! Stadium
! Capacity
! Appearance
! Last regular season
! Last season playoffs
! NBB Titles (Last title)
|-
| Basquete Cearense
| Fortaleza
| Ginásio Paulo Sarasate
| 8,200
| style="text-align: center;"| 8th
| style="text-align: center;"| 9h
| style="text-align: center;"| Round of 16
| style="text-align: center;"| 0
|-
| Sendi/Bauru Basket
| Bauru
| Ginásio Panela de Pressão
| 2,000
| style="text-align: center;"| 10th
| style="text-align: center;"| 5th
| style="text-align: center;"| Champions
| style="text-align: center;"| 1 (2016–17)
|-
| Botafogo
| Rio de Janeiro
| Ginásio Oscar Zelaya
| 850
| style="text-align: center;"| 1st
| style="text-align: center;"| -
| style="text-align: center;"| -
| style="text-align: center;"| 0
|-
| Campo Mourão Basquete
| Campo Mourão
| Ginásio de Esportes Belin Carolo
| 3,000
| style="text-align: center;"| 2nd
| style="text-align: center;"| 10th
| style="text-align: center;"| Round of 16
| style="text-align: center;"| -
|-
| Banrisul Caxias do Sul
| Caxias do Sul
| Ginásio Vasco da Gama
| 850
| style="text-align: center;"| 1st
| style="text-align: center;"| -
| style="text-align: center;"| -
| style="text-align: center;"| -

|-
| Flamengo
| Rio de Janeiro
| Arena Carioca 1
| 6,000
| style="text-align: center;"| 11th
| style="text-align: center;"| 1st
| style="text-align: center;"| Semifinals
| style="text-align: center;"| 5 (2015–16)
|-
| Sesi/Franca
| Franca
| Ginásio Pedrocão
| 6,000
| style="text-align: center;"| 11th
| style="text-align: center;"| 3rd
| style="text-align: center;"| Quarterfinals
| style="text-align: center;"| 0
|-
| Joinville/AABJ
| Joinville
| Centreventos Cau Hansen
| 4,000
| style="text-align: center;"| 2nd
| style="text-align: center;"| 13th
| style="text-align: center;"| DNQ
| style="text-align: center;"| 0
|-
| Liga Sorocabana
| Sorocaba
| Ginásio Gualberto Moreira
| 3,000
| style="text-align: center;"| 6th
| style="text-align: center;"| 13th
| style="text-align: center;"| DNQ
| style="text-align: center;"| 0
|-
| Minas
| Belo Horizonte
| Juscelino Kubitschek Arena
| 4,000
| style="text-align: center;"| 11th
| style="text-align: center;"| 9th
| style="text-align: center;"| Quarterfinals
| style="text-align: center;"| 0
|-
| Mogi das Cruzes/Helbor
| Mogi das Cruzes
| Ginásio Municipal Professor Hugo Ramos
| 5,000
| style="text-align: center;"| 7th
| style="text-align: center;"| 4th
| style="text-align: center;"| Runner-up
| style="text-align: center;"| 0
|-
| Paulistano
| São Paulo
| Ginásio Antônio Prado Junior
| 1,500
| style="text-align: center;"| 11th
| style="text-align: center;"| 2nd
| style="text-align: center;"| Champions
| style="text-align: center;"| 0
|-
| Pinheiros
| São Paulo
| Poliesportivo Henrique Villaboim
| 854
| style="text-align: center;"| 11th
| style="text-align: center;"| 7th
| style="text-align: center;"| Play-off First Round
| style="text-align: center;"| 0
|-
| São José
| São José dos Campos
| Lineu Moura
| 2.260
| style="text-align: center;"| 9th
| style="text-align: center;"| 2nd (Liga Ouro)
| style="text-align: center;"| DNP
| style="text-align: center;"| 0
|-
| Vasco da Gama
| Rio de Janeiro
| Ginásio Vasco da Gama
| 1,000
| style="text-align: center;"| 3rd
| style="text-align: center;"| 11th
| style="text-align: center;"| Play-off First Round
| style="text-align: center;"| 0
|-
| Universo Vitória
| Salvador
| Ginásio Poliesportivo de Cajazeiras Fazenda 
| 2.060
| style="text-align: center;"| 2nd
| style="text-align: center;"| 12th
| style="text-align: center;"| Round of 16
| style="text-align: center;"| 0
|-
|}

Regular season
The regular season began on Saturday, November 04, 2017 13:35 UTC−03:00 at Ginásio Antônio Prado Junior, home of Club Athletico Paulistano, who was defeated 72–71 by Sendi/Bauru Basket. The regular season ended on March 29, 2018.

Standings
The standings are updated according to the LNB official website table.

Results

Playoffs

Awards

Season awards

Most Valuable Player: Marquinhos Vieira (3)
Sixth Man of the Year Award: Deryk Ramos
Defensive Player of the Year Award: Jimmy de Oliveira (2)
Most Improved Player of the Year Award: Wesley Ferreira
NBB Coach of the Year (Ary Vidal Trophy): Gustavo de Conti (3)
NBB's Revelation Player of the Year:  Gabriel Jaú
NBB Finals MVP Award: Guilherme Hubner

References

External links
Official website 
New Basketball Brazil at Latinbasket.com

NBB
2017-18
Brazil